The 1441 Yangtze flood was a natural disaster affecting the area around Nanjing, China, during the Ming dynasty.

The flood occurred in the late autumn and broke the river's banks repeatedly. The situation was a major emergency not only for Nanjing and the surrounding area but also for the northern capital Beijing, which depended upon grain shipments from the Yangtze valley. The southern entrance to the Grand Canal was at Yangzhou near Nanjing and had to close during heavy flooding.

References

History of Nanjing
Disasters in Ming dynasty
Yangtze Flood, 1441
Yangtze Flood, 1441
Yangtze River floods
15th-century floods